The Fairey Seafox was a 1930s British reconnaissance floatplane designed and built by Fairey for the Fleet Air Arm. It was designed to be catapulted from the deck of a light cruiser and served in the Second World War.  Sixty-six were built, with two finished without floats and used as landplanes.

Design and development
The Fairey Seafox was built to satisfy Air Ministry Specification S.11/32 for a two-seat spotter-reconnaissance floatplane. The first of two prototypes appeared in 1936, first flying on 27 May 1936, and the first of the 64 production aircraft were delivered in 1937. The flights were organised as 700 Naval Air Squadron of the Fleet Air Arm.

The fuselage was of all-metal monocoque construction, the wings being covered with metal on the leading edge, otherwise fabric. It was powered by a 16-cylinder 395 hp (295 kW) air-cooled Napier Rapier H engine. It cruised at 106 mph (171 km/h), and had a range of 440 mi (710 km). The Seafox handled well but it was criticised for being underpowered, engine cooling was poor and landing speeds were higher than desired.

Operational history
In 1939, a Seafox played a part in the Battle of the River Plate against the German pocket battleship , by spotting for the naval gunners. They remained in service until 1943.

Operators

 Fleet Air Arm
 700 Naval Air Squadron
 702 Naval Air Squadron
 703 Naval Air Squadron
 713 Naval Air Squadron
 714 Naval Air Squadron
 716 Naval Air Squadron
 718 Naval Air Squadron
 754 Naval Air Squadron
 764 Naval Air Squadron
 765 Naval Air Squadron
 773 Naval Air Squadron

Specification

See also

References

Notes

Bibliography

 "For Light Reconnaissance" (PDF). Flight, 9 December 1937. pp. 570–574.
 Mondey, David. The Hamlyn Concise Guide to British Aircraft of World War II. London; New York: Aerospace Publishing Ltd., 1982. P.87. , .
 Sturtivant, Ray and Balance, Theo. The Squadrons of the Fleet Air Arm. Tonbridge, Kent, UK: Air Britain (Historians) Ltd., 1994. .
 Taylor, H.A. Fairey Aircraft since 1915. London: Putnam, 1974. .

External links

 Fairey Seafox – British Aircraft of World War II

1930s British military reconnaissance aircraft
Floatplanes
Seafox
Single-engined tractor aircraft
Biplanes
Aircraft first flown in 1936